José Eduardo Bischofe de Almeida or simply Zé Eduardo, also known as Zé Love (born 29 October 1987), is a Brazilian footballer who plays for Brasiliense FC.

Zé Eduardo holds an Italian passport.

Career

Early career
Zé Eduardo started his professional career in Palmeiras. During his stay at the club, José Eduardo earned the moniker of "Zé Love" and "God of Goalscorer" in a comparison with Palmeiras' standout striker Vagner Love because of his "very impressive" goal scoring stats. After an unremarkable stint at the São Paulo club, Zé Eduardo played for Portuguesa Santista, Atlético Paranaense, Cruzeiro (who bought 70% of the player's economic rights for R$ 300,000), Bragantino (2006 Campeonato Paulista), Ipatinga (April – May 2006), Villa Nova (2006 Taça Minas Gerais), Sport (January – August 2007), Grêmio (2007 Copa FGF), Ferroviária (2008 Campeonato Paulista Série A2) and Fortaleza (2008 Brasileiro Série B), also to no success . In December 2008, Zé Eduardo joined São Caetano's squad for the 2009 Campeonato Paulista, scoring only one goal for the team, but proving himself to be a valuable player for the team. After a short stint in América from Minas Gerais, Zé Eduardo joined Natal's ABC, where he drew the attention of the larger clubs after scoring three goals in nine matches.

Santos
Joining Santos with no fanfare, Zé Eduardo went on to find great glory at the Vila Belmiro club, at first on loan. Starting off as a substitute, Eduardo played remarkably well, eventually earning a place in the starting 11. Winning the Paulistão and the Copa do Brasil, Zé Eduardo was one of the best players of the Santos squad, scoring a hat-trick against Fluminense at Estádio Olímpico Nilton Santos, while Maracaña was under construction. Zé Eduardo was the team joint-fourth-scorer of the team in the Paulistão with 6 goals (along with Wesley), behind Neymar, André Felipe, Ganso. In the 2010 Campeonato Brasileiro Série A, Zé Eduardo scored 10 times, just 7 goals short of Neymar. Zé Eduardo's goals were ranked second in Santos and joint-8th in the league.

After playing for several teams, Zé Eduardo accepted an offer from Italian Serie A club Genoa, signing a five-year contract on 23 January 2011. It was impossible for him to join Genoa before the closing of the international transfer window because his Italian passport issuance was delayed. Consequently, Genoa allowed him to play for his former club Santos until 22 June (while during that 6 months his contract was owned by FC Lugano). On that day, he started for Santos in the second leg of the 2011 Copa Libertadores Finals, which Santos won 2–1 over Uruguayan powerhouse Peñarol. Santos received R$ 6.088 million (about €2.7M), as Santos owned 60% of the player's economic rights. Genoa announced that they paid €5.4 million to its sister club Lugano in its 2011 annual financial report.

Genoa
Zé Eduardo was formally signed by Genoa in the summer of 2011 and his contract was recorded by Lega Serie A on 3 August 2011. He featured in a pre-season friendly, but after a long intensive season in Brazil, he was injured and trained away from the main squad. Zé Eduardo made his official club debut on 2 December 2011, in a 2–0 defeat by Milan. He had a medical with West Ham United in late January 2012 but the loan deal collapsed. Returning to Italy, he made four appearances as a substitute. The first on 12 February. He played no games in March and did not appear again until 29 April 2012, again as a substitute. His squad number 9 was taken away and given to Italian international Alberto Gilardino with Zé Eduardo being given the number 57 shirt; a number usually taken by players left outside the main squad.

Zé Eduardo refused a trial with A.C. Milan on 22 August 2012, which would have seen him replace the injured Alexandre Pato. Zé Eduardo is quoted as saying, "I have won one Libertadores and two Campeonatos Paulistas with Santos, I don't do tests".

On 20 January 2014, he was signed by Coritiba on loan until the end of the season.

Career statistics

Honours
Villa Nova
 Taça Minas Gerais: 2006

Sport
 Campeonato Pernambucano: 2007

Santos
 Campeonato Paulista: 2010, 2011
 Copa do Brasil: 2010
 Copa Libertadores: 2011

References

External links
 
 

1987 births
Living people
Brazilian footballers
Footballers from São Paulo (state)
Association football forwards
Sociedade Esportiva Palmeiras players
Associação Atlética Portuguesa (Santos) players
Club Athletico Paranaense players
Cruzeiro Esporte Clube players
Ipatinga Futebol Clube players
Sport Club do Recife players
Villa Nova Atlético Clube players
Associação Ferroviária de Esportes players
Fortaleza Esporte Clube players
Associação Desportiva São Caetano players
América Futebol Clube (MG) players
ABC Futebol Clube players
Santos FC players
Coritiba Foot Ball Club players
Goiás Esporte Clube players
Genoa C.F.C. players
A.C.N. Siena 1904 players
Al-Shaab CSC players
Al-Faisaly FC players
Oeste Futebol Clube players
Sri Pahang FC players
Brasiliense Futebol Clube players
Shanghai Shenxin F.C. players
Campeonato Brasileiro Série A players
Campeonato Brasileiro Série B players
Campeonato Brasileiro Série C players
Serie A players
Chinese Super League players
Saudi Professional League players
UAE Pro League players
Malaysia Super League players
Brazilian expatriate footballers
Expatriate footballers in Italy
Expatriate footballers in China
Expatriate footballers in Saudi Arabia
Expatriate footballers in the United Arab Emirates
Expatriate footballers in Malaysia
Brazilian expatriate sportspeople in Italy
Brazilian expatriate sportspeople in China
Brazilian expatriate sportspeople in Saudi Arabia
Brazilian expatriate sportspeople in the United Arab Emirates
Brazilian expatriate sportspeople in Malaysia